Thomas Lowndes (January 22, 1766July 8, 1843) was an American planter, lawyer and politician from Charleston, South Carolina. He was the son of Rawlins Lowndes, governor of South Carolina during the American Revolutionary War and half-brother of William Lowndes (congressman) who helped secure the declaration of the War of 1812. Educated in Charleston, he studied law there and became a practicing lawyer in the city in the late 18th century.  He was a member of the state legislature from 1792 to 1799. He represented South Carolina's 1st Congressional District in the U.S. Congress from March 4, 1801, to March 3, 1805.  He was not re-elected in 1804.  He failed to win back his seat in 1808, and retired from public life thereafter.  He died in Charleston on July 8, 1843.

External links
Lowndes' Congressional biography

1766 births
1843 deaths
Federalist Party members of the United States House of Representatives from South Carolina